Allococalodes is a genus of Papuan jumping spiders that was first described by F. R. Wanless in 1982.  it contains only three species, found only in Papua New Guinea: A. alticeps, A. cornutus, and A. madidus. The name is a combination of Ancient Greek  ("allo"), meaning "other", and the genus Cocalodes''.

References

Salticidae
Salticidae genera
Spiders of Oceania